Datsun 280 may refer to:

 Datsun 280C, sedan car produced between 1979 and 1983
 Datsun 280Z, coupé produced between 1975 and 1978
 Datsun 280ZX, coupé produced between 1978 and 1983
 Datsun 280 ZZZAP, 1976 arcade game